"We've Got a Good Thing Going" is a song written by The Corporation and originally performed by Michael Jackson. Originally appearing on the B-side of Jackson's 1972 single "I Wanna Be Where You Are", it was later included on his second album, Ben. In 1981, Jamaican reggae singer Sugar Minott scored his biggest hit with a cover version of the song, reaching number 4 on the UK Singles Chart.

Die in Your Arms by Candian singer Justin Bieber samples the song.

Later versions
British pop singer Yazz recorded a version of the song in 1996 that reached number 53 on the UK Singles Chart.

EastEnders actor-turned-singer Sid Owen had a number 14 hit in the UK with the song in 2000.

References

1972 songs
Michael Jackson songs
Songs written by Berry Gordy
Songs written by Alphonzo Mizell
Songs written by Freddie Perren
Songs written by Deke Richards
Motown singles